Bobrowce  is a village in the administrative district of Gmina Mszczonów, within Żyrardów County, Masovian Voivodeship, in east-central Poland.

The village has a population of 300.

References

Bobrowce